Cortinarius citrino-olivaceus is a species of fungus native to central Europe.

References

citrino-olivaceus
Fungi of Europe